Galina Sergeyevna Ulanova (21 March 1998) was a Russian ballet dancer. She is frequently cited as being one of the greatest ballerinas of the 20th century.

Biography

Ulanova was born in Saint Petersburg, Russia. Both parents were the soloists of the Mariinsky theatre and danced with Anna Pavlova. Later, her father became a director and her mother taught ballet. Ulanova recalled that she 'never had a choice to pick a career' and due to her parents' profession, ballet was her only option. As a child she dreamed of becoming a sailor, saying she feared having the life of artists with lots of labour and no sleep. Nevertheless, her parents sent her to ballet school at a very young age, where she studied under Agrippina Vaganova and her own mother. 

When she joined the Mariinsky Theatre in 1928, the press found in her "much of Semyonova's style, grace, the same exceptional plasticity and a sort of captivating modesty in her gestures". Konstantin Stanislavsky, fascinated with her acting style, implored her to take part in his stage productions. In 1944, when her fame reached Joseph Stalin, he had her transferred to the Bolshoi Theatre, where she would be the prima ballerina assoluta for 16 years. The following year, she danced the title role in the world premiere of Sergei Prokofiev's Cinderella.

Ulanova was regarded as a great actress as well as a dancer, and when she was finally allowed to tour abroad at the age of 46, enraptured British papers wrote that "Galina Ulanova in London knew the greatest triumph of any individual dancer since Anna Pavlova". Having retired from the stage at the age of 50, she coached many generations of Russian dancers.

Ulanova was one of the few dancers to be awarded Hero of Socialist Labour and the only one to receive this honour twice. She was also awarded the highest exclusively artistic national title, People's Artist of the USSR. and she was awarded the Stalin Prize in 1941, 1946, 1947, 1950, and the Lenin Prize in 1957. She was elected a Foreign Honorary Member of the American Academy of Arts and Sciences in 1960.

She died in 1998 in Moscow, aged 88, and is buried in the cemetery of the Novodevichy Convent.

Ulanova's apartment in one of Moscow's Seven Sisters, the Kotelnicheskaya Embankment Building, is preserved now as a memorial museum. Monuments to Ulanova were erected in Saint Petersburg and Stockholm.

Opinions on Ulanova

Sergei Eisenstein: "Ulanova — cannot be grouped together with, compared to other dancers. In terms of what is most cherished, By the very nature of her secret…She belongs to a different dimension."
Sergey Prokofiev: "She is the genius of Russian ballet, its elusive soul, its inspired poetry. Ulanova imparts to her interpretation of classical roles a depth of expression unheard of in twentieth century ballet."
Evgeny Mravinsky: "The image of Ulanova – gentle, fragile and wise – was given to me in my early youth and is rooted in my heart and memory forever. Each encounter with Ulanova and her art, each memory of her – is always a great thrill and happiness. With thanks to her and gratitude to Fate for having given her to us."
Sviatoslav Richter: "Ulanova has charted new paths in ballet …Not only has she given us unforgettable characters, she has created her own artistic world – a realm of human spirituality… Ulanova has transformed ballet into a popular art form. Thanks to her even its most implacable enemies have become its supporters and thousands of people now acknowledge ballet to be a vital necessity."
Margot Fonteyn: "I cannot even begin to talk about Ulanova's dancing, it is so marvelous, I am left speechless. It is magic. Now we know what we lack."
Maya Plisetskaya: "Ulanova has created her own style, has schooled us to it. She represents an epoch, a time. She has her own hallmark. Like Mozart, Beethoven and Prokofiev she has had an impact, she has reflected her age."
Arnold Haskell: "My memories of Ulanova are, to me, a part of life itself, bringing a total enrichment of experience. To me, hers are not theatrical miracles but triumphs of human spirit. Where Pavlova was supremely conscious of her audience and could play upon its emotions as upon an instrument, Ulanova is remote in a world of her own, which we are privileged to penetrate. She is so completely identified with the character she impersonates that nothing outside exists."
Maya Plisetskaya: "She was an angel and she danced like one."
Maurice Béjart: "Galina Ulanova is a ballerina who has grasped the profoundest secrets of art, she has united feelings and their outer expression into an indivisible whole."
Rudolf Nureyev: "Only she, the world's Number One ballerina, kept unswervingly to her chosen course, always unassuming, modestly dressed, entirely absorbed in dance and totally unreceptive to backstage intrigue. Her inner strength, her human qualities – these explain why she has remained pure, untouched by the day-to-day hassle of theatre life."

Honours and awards

Soviet Union
Twice Hero of Socialist Labor (1974, 1980)
Four awards of the Order of Lenin (1953, 1979, 1974, 1980)
Four awards of the Order of Red Banner of Labor (1939, 1951, 1959, 1967)
Order of the Badge of Honor (1940)
Order of the Friendship of Peoples (1986)
Honored Artist of the RSFSR (1939)
People's Artist of the RSFSR (1940)
People's Artist of the Kazakh SSR (1943)
People's Artist of the USSR (1951)
Stalin Prize, First Class (1941) – for outstanding achievements in the field of ballet
Stalin Prize, First Class (1946) – for the performance of the title role in Cinderella by Prokofiev
Stalin Prize, First Class (1947) – for the performance of the title role in Romeo and Juliet by Prokofiev
Stalin Prize, Second Class (1950) – for her interpretation of the Tao-Hoa in ballet The Red Poppy by Gliere
Lenin Prize (1957)
Medal "For the Defence of Leningrad"
Medal "For Valiant Labor in the Great Patriotic War of 1941–1945"
Award and the Gold Medal Exhibition Center (1971)

Russia
Award of the President of the Russian Federation in the field of art and literature (1997)

Foreign
Order of Cyril and Methodius, I degree (Bulgaria) (1968)
Commander of the Order of Arts and Letters (France) (1992)
Parasat Order (1995, Kazakhstan)
Medal "For Finland", Order of the Lion of Finland (1958)

In popular culture 

Ulanova is portrayed by Aliya Tanikpaeva (billed as "Aliya Tanykpayeva") in a non-speaking role in  episode 1 of season 2 of the Netflix series The Crown.

She was earlier played by Cyd Charisse in the Hollywood film Mission to Moscow (1943).

See also
List of dancers
List of Russian ballet dancers

References

Further reading

External links

New York Times obituary
Sunday New York Times by Anna Kisselgoff, 29 March 1998
The Ballerina Gallery
The Gallery of Masters of Musical Theatre

1998 deaths
Prima ballerina assolutas
Russian ballerinas
Soviet ballerinas
Bolshoi Ballet principal dancers
People's Artists of the USSR
Mariinsky Ballet dancers
Heroes of Socialist Labour
Ballet mistresses
Fellows of the American Academy of Arts and Sciences
Prix Benois de la Danse jurors
Burials at Novodevichy Cemetery
1910 births
Recipients of the Order of Lenin
Recipients of the Order of Friendship of Peoples
People's Artists of the RSFSR
Honored Artists of the RSFSR
Lenin Prize winners
Stalin Prize winners
Vaganova graduates